Michael Forlong (1912–2000) was a New Zealand writer, producer and director. He worked for the New Zealand National Film Unit before moving to England.

Select credits
One Hundred Crowded Years (1940) - writer
Bitter Springs (1950) - assistant director
Suicide Mission (1954) - director, producer, writer
Odongo (1956) - second unit director
Safari (1956) - second unit director
Alexander the Great (1956) - second unit director
Dunkirk (1958) - associate producer
The Green Helmet (1961) - director
Over the Odds (1961) -director
Stork Talk (1962) - director
Tamahine (1963) - associate producer
 (1964) - director
Lionheart (1968) - director, producer, writer
Raising the Roof (1972) - director, writer
Close to the Wind (1972) (short) - director, producer, writer
Project 1233 (1972) (short) - director
Rangi's Catch (1973) - producer
Hijack! (1975) - director, producer, writer
High Rise Donkey (1980) - director

References

External links
Michael Forlong at IMDb
Biography at NZ On screen
Michael Forlong at BFI
Michael Forlong at Letterbox DVD

1912 births
2000 deaths
New Zealand film directors
New Zealand emigrants to the United Kingdom